Daisuke Kimura (born 23 August 1981) is a Japanese former breaststroke swimmer.

Kimura was a 200-metre breaststroke silver medalist behind Kosuke Kitajima at both the 2002 and 2006 Asian Games, but got the better of the Olympic champion to win the 2006 national title. He won a bronze medal for the 200 metre breaststroke at the 2002 Pan Pacific Swimming Championships and swam in two FINA World Championships.

References

External links

1981 births
Living people
Japanese male breaststroke swimmers
Universiade silver medalists for Japan
Universiade medalists in swimming
Medalists at the 2003 Summer Universiade
Asian Games silver medalists for Japan
Asian Games medalists in swimming
Swimmers at the 2002 Asian Games
Swimmers at the 2006 Asian Games
Medalists at the 2002 Asian Games
Medalists at the 2006 Asian Games